The 2022 United States House of Representatives elections in Michigan were held on November 8, 2022, to elect representatives for the thirteen seats in Michigan (reduced from 14 in the redistricting cycle following the 2020 United States census). The deadline for candidates to file for the August 2 primary was April 19. The congressional make up prior to the election was seven Democrats and seven Republicans. But after the 2020 Census, Michigan lost one congressional seat. Democrats won a majority of seats in the state for the first time since 2008. This can be partly attributed to the decrease in the number of districts, which resulted in two Republican incumbentsBill Huizenga and Fred Uptonin the new 4th district. Redistricting also played a part in shifting partisan lean of the districts which favored the Democrats overall, including in the 3rd district, which Democrats were able to flip with a margin of victory of 13 points. That was made possible by a non-partisan citizens commission drawing the new political boundaries instead of the Michigan legislature after a 2018 ballot proposal was approved.

District 1

The 1st district covers the Upper Peninsula and the northern part of the Lower Peninsula, including Traverse City. The incumbent is Republican Jack Bergman, who was re-elected with 61.6% of the vote in 2020. The winner is Jack Bergman.

Republican primary

Candidates

Nominee
Jack Bergman, incumbent U.S. Representative

Results

Democratic primary

Candidates

Nominee
Bob Lorinser, physician

Results

General election

Predictions

Endorsements

Results

District 2

The 2nd district runs along the eastern shoreline of Lake Michigan from Manistee to northern Muskegon County, includes parts of the Grand Rapids suburbs in Kent county, and parts of Central Michigan, including Mount Pleasant and western Midland County. Due to redistricting, the incumbent is Republican John Moolenaar of the 4th congressional district, who was re-elected with 65.0% of the vote in 2020. The winner is John Moolenaar.

Republican primary

Candidates

Nominee
John Moolenaar, incumbent U.S. Representative

Eliminated in primary
Tom Norton, veteran

Endorsements

Results

Democratic primary

Candidates

Nominee
Jerry Hilliard, nominee for Michigan's 4th congressional district in 2020

Results

General election

Predictions

Results

District 3

The 3rd district is based in western Michigan, and includes Grand Rapids, Muskegon, and parts of Ottawa County. The incumbent is Republican Peter Meijer, who was elected with 53.0% of the vote in 2020.

In the final days of the primary, the Democratic Congressional Campaign Committee bought $425,000 in TV ads that ostensibly attacked Gibbs (identifying him as "too conservative for West Michigan" and linking him to Trump) but were in fact designed to boost Gibbs' standing among pro-Trump Republican primary voters. The strategy—controversial within the Democratic Party—was based on the idea that Gibbs would be the weaker opponent in the general election, giving the Democrats an opportunity to win the 3rd district seat, which following the 2020 redistricting cycle had shifted from a Republican-leaning district to a swing district. The winner is Hillary Scholten. The strategy ended up successful, as Democrat Hillary Scholten flipped the district after winning by 12.93%. In flipping the district to the Democratic side, Scholten became the first Democratic member of Congress from the area since 1977.

Republican primary

Candidates

Nominee
John Gibbs, former Assistant Secretary of Housing and Urban Development for Community Planning and Development and software engineer

Eliminated in primary
Peter Meijer, incumbent U.S. Representative

Endorsements

Polling

Results

Democratic primary

Candidates

Nominee
Hillary Scholten, attorney and nominee for Michigan's 3rd congressional district in 2020

Results

General election

Predictions

Endorsements

Polling 

Peter Meijer vs. Hillary Scholten

Results

District 4

The 4th district is based in southwestern Michigan, and includes the cities of Kalamazoo and Holland. Due to redistricting, there are two incumbents in this district – Republican Bill Huizenga of the 2nd congressional district, who was re-elected with 59.2% of the vote in 2020 and Republican Fred Upton of the 6th congressional district, who was re-elected with 55.8% of the vote in 2020. Upton announced that he is retiring at the end of his term. The winner is Bill Huizenga.

Republican primary

Candidates

Nominee
Bill Huizenga, incumbent U.S. Representative

Withdrawn
Steve Carra, state representative (running for re-election, endorsed Huizenga)

Declined
Fred Upton, incumbent U.S. Representative

Endorsements

Results

Democratic primary

Candidates

Nominee
Joseph Alfonso, member of the Michigan State Plumbing Board, non-profit treasurer, and U.S. Marine Corps veteran

Withdrawn
Chris Glasser

Endorsements

Results

General election

Predictions

Results

District 5

The 5th district runs along Michigan's entire southern border with Indiana and Ohio and includes the cities of Three Rivers, Jackson, and Monroe. Due to redistricting, the incumbent is Republican Tim Walberg of the 7th congressional district, who was re-elected with 58.8% of the vote in 2020. The winner is Tim Walberg.

Republican primary

Candidates

Nominee
Tim Walberg, incumbent U.S. Representative

Eliminated in primary
Sherry O'Donnell, osteopathic physician

Endorsements

Results

Democratic primary

Candidates

Nominee
 Bart Goldberg, attorney

Results

General election

Predictions

Results

District 6

The 6th district is based in southeastern Michigan, taking in Washtenaw County, parts of Wayne and Oakland counties, including the cities of Ann Arbor, Canton, Novi, and Ypsilanti. Due to redistricting, the incumbent is Democrat Debbie Dingell of the 12th congressional district, who was re-elected with 66.4% of the vote in 2020. The winner is Debbie Dingell.

Democratic primary

Candidates

Nominee
Debbie Dingell, incumbent U.S. Representative

Endorsements

Results

Republican primary

Candidates

Nominee
Whittney Williams, auto show product specialist and candidate for Michigan's 11th congressional district in 2020

Eliminated in primary
Hima Kolanagireddy, businesswoman

Results

General election

Predictions

Results

District 7

The 7th district is based around the Lansing–East Lansing metropolitan area, but also includes Livingston County and a small part of Oakland County. Due to redistricting, the incumbent is Democrat Elissa Slotkin of the 8th congressional district, who was re-elected with 50.9% of the vote in 2020.

In 2018, total campaign spending for the seat won by Slotkin drew the highest amount for a U.S. House seat in Michigan's history. In October 2022, the Slotkin–Barrett race was the most expensive House race nationwide. Slotkin was re-elected.

Democratic primary

Candidates

Nominee 
Elissa Slotkin, incumbent U.S. Representative

Endorsements

Results

Republican primary

Candidates

Nominee
Tom Barrett, state senator from the 24th district

Declined
 John James, businessman, former U.S. Army Captain and Republican nominee for the U.S. Senate in 2018 and 2020 (running in Michigan's 10th congressional district)
Paul Junge, former news anchor for FOX 47 News, former external affairs director at ICE, and nominee for Michigan's 8th congressional district in 2020 (running in Michigan's 8th congressional district)

Endorsements

Results

General election

Predictions

Endorsements

Polling 
Aggregate polls

Graphical summary

Generic Democrat vs. generic Republican

Results

District 8

The 8th district centers around the Saginaw Bay and includes the cities of Flint, Saginaw, Bay City, and Midland. Due to redistricting, the incumbent is Democrat Dan Kildee of the 5th congressional district, who was re-elected with 54.5% of the vote in 2020. Kildee was re-elected.

Democratic primary

Candidates

Nominee
Dan Kildee, incumbent U.S. Representative

Endorsements

Results

Republican primary

Candidates

Nominee
Paul Junge, former news anchor for FOX 47 News, former external affairs director at ICE, and nominee for Michigan's 8th congressional district in 2020

Eliminated in primary
Candice Miller, retired businesswoman
Matthew Seely, businessman

Failed to qualify
Bryan Trouten

Declined
Bill Schuette, former Michigan Attorney General (2011–2019) and Republican nominee for Michigan Governor in 2018

Endorsements

Results

Independent and third-party candidates

Libertarian Party

Presumptive nominee
David Canny

General election

Predictions

Polling

Results

District 9

The 9th district is based in The Thumb region, including Port Huron as well as the northern Detroit exurbs in Oakland and Macomb counties. Due to redistricting, the incumbent is Republican Lisa McClain formerly of the 10th congressional district, who was elected with 66.3% of the vote in 2020. McClain was re-elected.

Republican primary

Candidates

Nominee
Lisa McClain, incumbent U.S. Representative

Eliminated in primary
Michelle Donovan, attorney

Endorsements

Results

Democratic primary

Candidates

Nominee
Brian Jaye, attorney

Results

General election

Predictions

Results

District 10

The 10th district is based primarily in southeastern Michigan's Macomb County, taking in Warren and Sterling Heights, as well as a small portion of eastern Oakland County. Due to redistricting after the 2020 census, this is an open district with no incumbent. The winner is John James.

Democratic primary

Candidates

Nominee
Carl Marlinga, former Macomb County Circuit Court Judge and candidate for U.S. Senate in 1994

Eliminated in primary
Huwaida Arraf, civil rights attorney
Rhonda Powell, former director of Macomb County Health and Community Services
Angela Rogensues, Warren City Council member
Henry Yanez, Sterling Heights council member and former state representative

Declined
Andy Levin, U.S. Representative (running in Michigan's 11th congressional district)
Michael Taylor, mayor of Sterling Heights

Endorsements

Polling

Results

Republican primary

Candidates

Nominee
John James, businessman and nominee for the U.S. Senate in 2018 and 2020

Eliminated in primary
Tony Marcinkewciz

Withdrawn
Eric Esshaki, attorney and nominee for Michigan's 11th congressional district in 2020 (endorsed James)

Declined
Mike Bishop, former U.S. Representative (2015–2019) (endorsed James)
Candice Miller, Macomb County Public Works Commissioner, former U.S. Representative for Michigan's 10th congressional district (2003-2017), and former Michigan Secretary of State (1995-2003) (endorsed James)

Endorsements

Polling

Results

General election

Predictions

Endorsements

Polling 
Aggregate polls

Graphical summary

Carl Marlinga vs. Eric Esshaki

Andy Levin vs. John James

Haley Stevens vs. John James

Michael Taylor vs. Eric Esshaki

Michael Taylor vs. John James

Generic Democrat vs. generic Republican

Results

District 11

The 11th district is based solely in Oakland County and includes the cities of Royal Oak and Pontiac. Due to redistricting, there are two incumbents in this district – Democrat Haley Stevens, who was re-elected with 50.2% of the vote in 2020 and Democrat Andy Levin of the 9th congressional district, who was re-elected with 57.7% of the vote in 2020. The winner is Haley Stevens.

Democratic primary

Candidates

Nominee
Haley Stevens, incumbent U.S. Representative

Eliminated in primary
Andy Levin, incumbent U.S. Representative

Endorsements

Polling

Results

Republican primary

Candidates

Nominee
Mark Ambrose, financial analyst

Eliminated in primary
Matthew DenOtter, realtor

Results

General election

Predictions

Results

District 12

The 12th district is based in northern Wayne County and includes the cities of Dearborn and Southfield. Due to redistricting, the incumbent is Democrat Brenda Lawrence of the 14th congressional district, who was re-elected with 79.3% of the vote in 2020. On January 4, 2022, Lawrence announced that she would not seek re-election. Subsequently, Democrat Rashida Tlaib of the 13th congressional district, announced she would be running in the district. Tlaib was re-elected in 2020 with 78.1% of the vote.

Democratic primary

Candidates

Nominee
Rashida Tlaib, incumbent U.S. Representative

Eliminated in primary
Kelly Garrett, mayor of Lathrup Village
Shanelle Jackson, former state representative, candidate for Michigan's 13th congressional district in 2012 and 2018
Janice Winfrey, Detroit City Clerk and candidate for Michigan's 13th congressional district in 2016

Declined
Brenda Lawrence, incumbent U.S. Representative

Endorsements

Polling

Results

Republican primary

Candidates

Nominee 
Steven Elliott, businessman

Eliminated in primary 
James Hooper, tradesman
Hassan Nehme, auto worker

Endorsements

Results

General election

Predictions

Results

District 13

The 13th district is based solely in Wayne County and includes most of Detroit and the cities of Taylor and Romulus. Due to redistricting after the 2020 census, this is an open district with no incumbent. The winner is Shri Thanedar.

Democratic primary

Candidates

Nominee
Shri Thanedar, state representative

Eliminated in primary
John Conyers III, son of former U.S. Representative John Conyers
Sherry Gay-Dagnogo, Detroit school board member and former state representative
Michael Griffie, lawyer and official for Teach For America Detroit
Adam Hollier, state senator
Sharon McPhail, former Detroit General Counsel
Sam Riddle, organizer and felon
Portia Roberson, CEO of Focus: HOPE, Michigan Civil Rights Commissioner
Lorrie Rutledge, businesswoman

Withdrew
Ralph Godbee Jr., former Detroit Police Chief

Declined
Garlin Gilchrist, Lieutenant Governor of Michigan
Rashida Tlaib, incumbent U.S. Representative (Running in Michigan's 12th congressional district)

Endorsements

Polling

Results

Republican primary

Candidates

Nominee
Martell Bivings, policy analyst

Results

General election

Predictions

Endorsements

Results

Notes

Partisan clients

References

External links
Official campaign websites for 1st district candidates
Jack Bergman (R) for Congress
Bob Lorinser (D) for Congress

Official campaign websites 2nd district candidates
Jerry Hilliard (D) for Congress
John Moolenaar (R) for Congress

Official campaign websites 3rd district candidates
John Gibbs (R) for Congress
Hillary Scholten (D) for Congress

Official campaign websites for 4th district candidates
Joseph Alfonso (D) for Congress
Bill Huizenga (R) for Congress

Official campaign websites for 5th district candidates
Bart Goldberg (D) for Congress
Tim Walberg (R) for Congress

Official campaign websites for 6th district candidates
Debbie Dingell (D) for Congress
Whittney Williams (R) for Congress

Official campaign websites for 7th district candidates
Tom Barrett (R) for Congress
Elissa Slotkin (D) for Congress

Official campaign websites for 8th district candidates
Paul Junge (R) for Congress
Dan Kildee (D) for Congress

Official campaign websites for 9th district candidates
Brian Jaye (D) for Congress
Lisa McClain (R) for Congress

Official campaign websites for 10th district candidates
John James (R) for Congress
Carl Marlinga (D) for Congress

Official campaign websites for 11th district candidates
Mark Ambrose (R) for Congress
Haley Stevens (D) for Congress

Official campaign websites for 12th district candidates
Steven Elliott (R) for Congress
Rashida Tlaib (D) for Congress

Official campaign websites for 13th district candidates
Martell Bivings (R) for Congress
Shri Thanedar (D) for Congress

2022
Michigan
United States House of Representatives